The United States Power Soccer Association (USPSA) is the governing body of power soccer in the United States.  

It was formally established in July 2006 as the US affiliate member of FIPFA. It was accepted as an affiliate member of the United States Soccer Federation on February 19, 2008.

See also
Powerchair Football

References

External links
United States Power Soccer Association
Federation International de Powerchair Football Associations (FIPFA)

Wheelchair sports
Parasports organizations in the United States
Soccer governing bodies in the United States
Sports organizations established in 2006